Syntomeida syntomoides is a moth in the subfamily Arctiinae. It was described by Jean Baptiste Boisduval in 1836. It is found in Mexico as well as on Cuba, the Bahamas, Saint Lucia, Dominica and Barbados.

References

Moths described in 1836
Euchromiina